Gregory M. Erickson, Ph.D. in paleobiology at Florida State University.

Erickson has published many papers on the ontogeny and growth patterns of alligators and dinosaurs, especially on the theropod Tyrannosaurus rex. Erickson has also been contributing when naming and describing some dinosaur genera, like Guanlong (2006) and Limusaurus (2009). He is a strong proponent to the idea of a dinosaurian origin of birds.

Erickson has been featured in BBC’s program The Truth About Killer Dinosaurs, in which he estimates the bite force of Tyrannosaurus rex. He was also featured in an episode of Science Of Sex Appeal (Discovery Channel), which discuss how dinosaurs reproduced.

Publications
Xu, Xing; Clark, James M; Forster, Catherine A; Norell, Mark A; Erickson, Gregory M; Eberth, David A; Jia, Chengkai & Zhao, Qi (9 February 2006). "A basal tyrannosauroid dinosaur from the Late Jurassic of China" Nature, 9: 715-718.

References

External links
Gregory M. Erickson's profile at Florida State University's homepage.

American paleontologists
Living people
Year of birth missing (living people)